This is a list of Australian films scheduled for release in 2019.

Film releases

See also
 2019 in Australia
 2019 in Australian television
 List of 2019 box office number-one films in Australia

References

2019
Lists of 2019 films by country or language
Films